Royse City is a city in Rockwall County in the U.S. state of Texas. It also extends into Collin and Hunt counties. The population was 2,957 at the 2000 census, rising to 9,349 in 2010. The estimated population in 2018 was 12,998. In 2020, its population grew to 13,508.

History
Garrett Burgess Griffin Royse, better known as Byrd Royse, was born in Adair County, Kentucky, on January 31, 1838, to William and Mary Stone Royse. He was the seventh of 14 children. Around 1850, Royse's future grandmother-in-law, Mrs. Nancy McCasland, and her sons bought several tracts of land that were later to be known as Royse City.

Royse was instrumental in getting the Missouri, Kansas and Texas Railway line brought from Greenville to Dallas through Rockwall County. Royse City was settled in 1885, when the railway came through the area. The town was named after G. B. Royse, who plotted the town and sold the first lots.

After its founding, Royse City preserved its stable, small, country-town status due to its proximity to Garland (21 miles away) and Dallas (33 miles).

Interstate 30 was constructed just south of the city in the mid-1960s. The city grew south to meet the interstate.

In 2000, Royse City had a population of 2,957. Still a small town, Royse City was feeling the impacts of the rapid growth of the Dallas-Fort Worth area, along with Rockwall County. The city's location along Interstate 30 between Rockwall and Greenville helped to fuel this growth.

Royse City has grown rapidly to the north and south as newer subdivisions have been built. By 2010, Royse City had a population of 9,349, according to the U.S. Census Bureau. This represents a growth rate of 216.2%.

Geography
Royse City is located in the northeast corner of Rockwall County, and extends north into Collin County and east into Hunt County.

Demographics

As of the 2020 United States census, there were 13,508 people, 4,608 households, and 3,711 families residing in the city. In 2000, 2,957 people, 1,027 households, and 781 families were residing in the city.

At the 2000 census, the racial makeup of the city was 79.44% White, 7.51% African American, 0.47% Native American, 0.54% Asian, 9.54% from other races, and 2.50% from two or more races. Hispanics or Latinos of any race were 20.97% of the population. Following nationwide trends of greater diversification, the racial and ethnic makeup in 2020 was 61.67% non-Hispanic white, 8.31% Black or African American, 1.64% Asian, 0.09% Pacific Islander, 0.26% some other race, 4.46% multiracial, and 23.11% Hispanic or Latino of any race.

In 2000, the median income for a household in the city was $42,266, and for a family was $48,804. Males had a median income of $30,966 versus $23,804 for females. The per capita income for the city was $17,153. About 8.4% of families and 10.4% of the population were below the poverty line, including 12.0% of those under age 18 and 10.2% of those age 65 or over.

Economy
Royse City serves as a bedroom community for nearby Dallas and Greenville. Most of the development in the city is residential. The local economy consists of service businesses, restaurants, stores, schools, and medical offices.  In June 2019, the popular travel center chain Buc-ee's added a store in Royse City.

In 2007, Royse City was designated as an official Texas Main Street City. The Royse City Main Street program was set up to promote the city's downtown area, where the goals are to foster a thriving business district, while preserving historic buildings. In 2015, construction was completed on an overpass at Interstate 30 and Erby Campbell Blvd.  Walmart and CVS opened stores in Royse City shortly thereafter.

Education

Public schools
Royse City is served by the Royse City Independent School District.

Infrastructure

Roads
 Interstate 30 is the primary route through Royse City.
 Texas State Highway 66.

Notable people

 Taylor Hearn, baseball player
 Gus Ketchum, baseball player
 Olivia Mojica, semi-finalist from American Idol
 Glen Payne, southern gospel vocalist, formerly of the Cathedral Quartet

References

External links
 Royse City official website
 Royse City Chamber of Commerce

Cities in Texas
Cities in Collin County, Texas
Cities in Rockwall County, Texas
Dallas–Fort Worth metroplex
Populated places established in 1885
1885 establishments in Texas